NSND Lê Dung (5 June 1951 in Hòn Gai, Quảng Ninh – 29 January 2001 in Hanoi) was a Vietnamese soprano opera singer. She was a student at the Tchaikovsky Conservatory and toured and performed widely in Eastern Europe. She won prizes at Sofia, Bulgaria 1987, Toulouse 1988 and Pyongyang. She was a member of the Hanoi Opera but also sang and recorded the works of Phú Quang and other popular songwriters. In 1993, she became the youngest ever person to be accredited as People's Artist ("NSND"), Vietnam's top artistic award for a living artist - second only to the often posthumous Ho Chi Minh Prize.

Discography

Vietnamese music
 10 ca khúc Hồng Đăng, Saigon Audio, 1995
 10 tình khúc Lê Khắc Thanh Hoài, Paris, 1995
 Âm thanh ngày mới
 Dạ khúc
 Màu nắng có bao giờ phai đâu
 Họa mi hót trong mưa
 Kỉ niệm vàng son 1
 Kỉ niệm vàng son 2
 Tiếng hát Lê Dung
 Tình nghệ sĩ
 Tiếng thời gian
 Những tình khúc thính phòng, 2001

Western classical
 O mio babbino caro from Puccini's Gianni Schicchi
 Beethoven's Ninth Symphony "Ode an die Freude", Le Dung, with Mezzo-Soprano Phuong Lan, Tenor Manh Chung and baritone Quang Tho. Hanoi Conservatory of Music and Hanoi Opera House. under the French conductor Xavier Rist. Televised performance.

References

External links
Listing of names of 1993 Awards of People's Artist (Vietnamese) on vi.Wikipedia

20th-century Vietnamese women singers
Operatic sopranos
People's Artists of Vietnam
1951 births
2001 deaths
People from Quảng Ninh province
20th-century women opera singers